Avery Hayward Haines (born 28 November 1966) is an American-born, Canadian television journalist, and currently Managing Editor, Investigative Journalist, and Host of Canada's longest-running and most-watched CTV newsmagazine series W5. Born in New Mexico, United States, Haines and her family then moved to India where they lived for six years before returning to North America. Her career as a reporter began with CFRB radio in Toronto.

Career

CTV Newsnet

In late 1999, Haines began to work as a fill-in anchor for CTV Newsnet.

On 15 January 2000, working a shift for the news channel, Haines made a mistake with a line while taping a report introduction. After regaining her composure, she made a joke but the camera was still on. Haines retaped the segment, but later that day, a CTV technician mistakenly aired the tape that included the error and the comment. On 17 January, Haines was fired from CTV Newsnet after her comments sparked controversy. "I kind of like the stuttering thing. It's like equal opportunity right? We've got a stuttering newscaster. We've got the black, we've got the Asian, we've got the woman. I could be a lesbian-folk-dancing-black-woman stutterer. In a wheelchair ... with a gimping, rubber leg. Yeah, really. I'd have a successful career, let me tell you.".

The unnamed technician was suspended.

City TV

Haines was soon hired by Citytv Toronto as a health reporter with CityNews. In fall 2001, she began hosting Health on the Line, which aired on Life Network and Discovery Health for five seasons.

On 15 September 2010, Haines returned to Citytv as a senior reporter and anchor. Beginning on 26 January 2012, Haines wrote and hosted the award-winning Inside Story on Citytv .

In 2016, Haines began to produce and shoot her own documentaries. Whilst volunteering on a medical humanitarian mission to post-Ebola Liberia, she produced a documentary highlighting the plight of chimpanzees that were abandoned following years of experimentation by a U.S. research laboratory. Haines also interviewed the former Warlord Charles G. Taylor's wife and current vice-president of Liberia, Jewel Howard Taylor producing a documentary called My Penpal: The Warlord's Wife. The following year, during the final offensive against the Islamic State of Iraq and the Levant (ISIS) in West Mosul, Haines was embedded with the Iraqi Special Forces in an abandoned mosque that had previously served as an ISIS headquarters. Both documentaries were nominated for RTDNA awards, and, 'Two Kilometres to Terror: Life and Death Under ISIS,' was awarded the '2018 RTDNA Dave Rogers Award for Long Feature (Large Market)'.''

On 12 October 2017, during the 5 PM newscast, CityNews Avery announced she would be leaving the organization.

CTV W5

On 12 October 2017, CTV announced on social media that Haines had accepted a job as a co-host and correspondent on its news magazine, W5. W5 is Canada's most-watched newsmagazine-documentary program, averaging 1m viewers per week.

Since joining W5, Haines has won and been nominated for numerous awards for her national and international long-format investigative documentaries. 
In 2019, she was awarded the RTDNA for 'Investigative Journalism' for her one-hour documentary entitledW5: No Witnesses, an exposé of a global sex abuse cover-up within the Jehovah's Witnesses sect. In 2019, she was also awarded the Innocence Canada Tracey Tyler Award for Justice for the Wrongly Convicted for W5: An Indigenous man's quest to clear his name.

In 2020, Haines won Canadian Screen Awards for 'Best Host or Interviewer, News or Information' for the W5 investigation The Narco Riviera. The academy described the documentary as "A powerful investigation into drug cartel violence in Mexico and the risk posed to tourists, including Canadians, who travel south seeking sun and sand but may find their lives at risk. The documentary includes an exclusive, chilling interview with a cartel leader – a risky and difficult to organize a journalistic coup. Following the broadcast Mexican authorities stepped up their investigations, eventually arresting drug cartel members in the 'Narco Riviera'". Haines was also awarded the 2020 Canadian Screen Awards 'Best News or Information Program' for W5: The Baby in the Snow. This W5 investigation into who left 11-month-old Dusty Bowers to die in the snow forced the Ontario Provincial Police to reopen this 30-year-old cold case.

In 2021, Haines was awarded the Canadian Screen Awards for 'Best News or Information Program' for the W5 investigation The Invisible Man. This W5 documentary investigates romance fraud, finding victims who have been scammed out of their life's savings but also tracks the schemes to a vast international cartel of criminals, stretching to a secretive Nigerian fraud ring.

In 2022, Haines won the Canadian Screen Awards for 'Best News or Information Program' for the W5 investigation: A Town Divided. The documentary investigated a preacher who made headlines for defying public health laws during the COVID-19 pandemic, sending shockwaves through a small Ontario town. Pastor Henry Hildebrandt from the Christian Fundamentalist Church of God emerged as a hero to the anti-lockdown crowd, preaching against the government, police, and the medical community over public health restrictions. The W5 investigation uncovered former members who expose his church as a child-abusing cult with a prophecy about the looming apocalypse.

Personal life

Haines is the sister of Emily Haines, lead singer of the band Metric. Both Avery and Emily are daughters of Paul Haines, noted poet and librettist of Escalator over the Hill, which was co-written with Carla Bley.

Haines came out as being in a same-sex relationship following the 2016 Orlando nightclub shooting, which occurred eight weeks and one day after she married her partner, Mel.

Awards
In 2002 and 2005, Haines' television programme 'Health on the Line' won Gemini Awards for Best Talk Series. In 2005, she was personally nominated for a Gemini in a hosting/interviewer category.

In 2013, Haines' Inside Story was awarded the Media Award by the Tema Conter Memorial Trust, 'Best In-depth Television Reporting' by The Radio Television Digital News Association (RTDNA) and the Canadian Medical Association Media Award a Special Mention 'Excellence in Health Reporting for the Inside Story: 'Dystonia'.

In 2014, the Inside Story was nominated for three Canadian Screen Awards including Best Local Reportage and Best News Information Segment.

In 2015, she received another Canadian Screen Awards nomination for Best Local Reportage for 'When the Blue Line Flatlines'.

In 2018, Haines was nominated for two RTDNAs for documentaries shot by herself in Liberia and Iraq: 'My Penpal: The Warlord's Wife' and 'Two Kilometres to Terror: Life and Death Under ISIS'. The latter documentary, filmed by Haines when she was embedded with the Iraqi Special Forces in West Mosul, went on to be awarded the RTDNA Dave Rogers Award for Long Feature (Large Market).

In 2019, Haines won the RTDNA Dan MCArthur Award for 'Investigative Journalism' for W5: No Witnesses, and the Innocence Canada Tracey Tyler Award for Justice for the Wrongly Convicted for W5: An Indigenous man's quest to clear his name.

In 2021, Haines won the 2020 Canadian Screen Awards for 'Best Host or Interviewer, News or Information' for W5: The Narco Riviera and 'Best News or Information Program' for W5: the Baby in the Snow. In 2021, Haines was also awarded the Canadian Screen Awards for 'Best News or Information Program' for the W5 investigation The Invisible Man.

In 2022, Haines won the Canadian Screen Awards for 'Best Host or Interviewer, News or Information' for her work on the W5 documentary "A Town Divided."

References

External links

1960s births
Living people
Canadian television reporters and correspondents
People from New Mexico
Canadian women television journalists
Canadian television news anchors
Canadian LGBT broadcasters
Canadian LGBT journalists
20th-century Canadian journalists
21st-century Canadian journalists
20th-century Canadian women
Canadian Screen Award winning journalists
21st-century Canadian LGBT people